Emma Sidi is an actress, comedian and writer for radio, stage and screen.

Early and personal life
Sidi's father Paul, who had previously played top level Rugby union for Harlequins in London, was working in banking in the US when Sidi was born. The family left when Sidi was three years old and her father would retrain as a physiotherapist in Chertsey, Surrey. Sidi was brought up and schooled near Woking, before studying French and Spanish at Emmanuel College, Cambridge, which included a spell living in Tuxtla Gutiérrez in Mexico. Sidi was a member of the Cambridge Footlights.

Career

Stand-up
Sidi was a finalist for the NATYS: New Act of the Year Show in 2016. Her solo shows have often included Sidi playing many different characters. Sidi's Edinburgh Festival Fringe show ‘Character Breakdown’, in 2015, saw her play six different roles, including a feminist professor who delivers a lecture entirely in Spanish. Sidi's 2016 show, ‘Telenovela’, a Mexican soap opera and a European woman who dreams of a life as a TV presenter. In 2018 her show '‘Faces of Grace'’ included an American fresh from a bizarre blind date and a tearful wannabe Love Island contestant. There was also an aspiring nurse described as having “a clench-jawed Katharine Hepburn style drawl”.

Television and radio 
Sidi appeared in W1A and as Vlogger Millipede in BAFTA-nominated Pls Like. Sidi's other television appearances include in Stath Lets Flats, Drunk History,  King Gary, Ghosts and in Starstruck with real life housemate Rose Matafeo. Sidi has also written and performed on The Now Show In June 2020 during the COVID-19 pandemic Sidi released La Princesa de Woking, a web pilot based on a character from her 2016 Edinburgh Festival Fringe show in which a Spanish-language soap opera is set in a British cul-de-sac. In July 2021 she appeared as Natalie, Secretary to ex-Prime Minister Henry Tobin, on the BBC radio comedy Party's Over.

References

Living people
Year of birth missing (living people)
Alumni of Emmanuel College, Cambridge
British women screenwriters
Comedians from London
English actresses
English comedy writers
English stand-up comedians
English women comedians
People from Woking